Selokuḱi is a village in the municipality of Debar, North Macedonia.

Demographics
As of the 2021 census, Selokuḱi had 16 residents with the following ethnic composition:
Persons for whom data are taken from administrative sources 16

According to the 2002 census, the village had a total of 104 inhabitants. Ethnic groups in the village include:
Albanians 104

References

External links

Villages in Debar Municipality
Albanian communities in North Macedonia